Karl Glad (born 26 September 1937) is a Norwegian jurist and industrialist. He was born in Oslo. He served as manager of Akergruppen from 1980 to 1987,  and CEO of Aker AS from 1989 to 1991. He was manager of the Confederation of Norwegian Enterprise from 1991 to 1999.

References

1937 births
Living people
Businesspeople from Oslo